Wollbach may refer to:

Wollbach, Lower Franconia, a municipality in the district of Rhön-Grabfeld in Bavaria, Germany
Wollbach (Burkardroth), a part of Burkardroth, a municipality in the district of Bad Kissingen in Bavaria, Germany
Wollbach (Kandern), a part of Kandern, a town in the district of Lörrach in Baden-Württemberg, Germany
Wollbach (Kander), a river of Baden-Württemberg, Germany, left tributary of the river Kander in Wollbach (Kandern)